Novak Djokovic was the defending champion, but chose not to participate that year.

First-seeded Roger Federer won in the final 7–6(7–5), 1–2, after Nikolay Davydenko retired due to a left leg injury.

Seeds

Draw

Finals

Top half

Bottom half

External links
 Draw
 Qualifying draw

2008 Men's Singles
Estoril Open
Estoril Open